Jacques Kossowski (born October 11, 1940 in Paris) was a member of the National Assembly of France.  He represented the 3rd constituency of the Hauts-de-Seine department,  and is a member of the Union for a Popular Movement. He is also the Mayor of Courbevoie, Hauts-de-Seine since 1995.

References

1940 births
Living people
Politicians from Paris
French people of Polish descent
The Republicans (France) politicians
Rally for the Republic politicians
Union for a Popular Movement politicians
The Social Right
Mayors of places in Île-de-France
Deputies of the 12th National Assembly of the French Fifth Republic
Deputies of the 13th National Assembly of the French Fifth Republic
Deputies of the 14th National Assembly of the French Fifth Republic